Arkońskie-Niemierzyn is a municipal neighbourhood of the city of Szczecin, Poland. It is situated on the left bank of the Oder River, north-west of the Szczecin Old Town, in Zachód (West) District. As of January 2011, it had a population of 11,533.

Arkońskie-Niemierzyn comprises Osiedle Arkońskie and Niemierzyn.

References 

Neighbourhoods of Szczecin